Fulvio Centoz (born 4 February 1975 in Aosta) is an Italian politician.

He is a member of the Democratic Party and he served as mayor in Rhêmes-Notre-Dame from 2010 to 2015. He was elected Mayor of Aosta on 11 May 2015 and took office on 15 June.

See also
2015 Italian local elections
List of mayors of Aosta

References

External links
 
 
 

1975 births
Living people
Mayors of Aosta
Democratic Party (Italy) politicians